West Virginia's 6th Senate district is one of 17 districts in the West Virginia Senate. It is currently represented by Republicans Mark Maynard and Chandler Swope. All districts in the West Virginia Senate elect two members to staggered four-year terms. District 6 is currently the most Republican-leaning district in the Senate.

Geography
District 6 stretches along the state's southwestern border, covering all of Mercer County and parts of McDowell, Mingo, and Wayne Counties. It includes the communities of Bluefield, Princeton, Bluewell, Athens, Welch, Williamson, and Gilbert Creek.

The district is located entirely within West Virginia's 3rd congressional district, and overlaps with the 19th, 20th, 21st, 25th, 26th, and 27th districts of the West Virginia House of Delegates. It borders the states of Kentucky and Virginia.

Recent election results

2022

Historical election results

2020

2018

2016

2014

2012

Federal and statewide results in District 6

References

6
McDowell County, West Virginia
Mercer County, West Virginia
Mingo County, West Virginia
Wayne County, West Virginia